Brereton Lake railway station is located in the community of Brereton Lake, Manitoba. This station is currently in use by Via Rail. Transcontinental Canadian trains stop here.

References

External links
 Brereton Lake railway station

Via Rail stations in Manitoba
Whiteshell Provincial Park